Kesamudram is a mandal in Mahabubabad District of the Indian state of Telangana.

Villages
The villages that fall under Kesamudram Mandal are:
Mahamoodpatnam(Thimmempet)
Kesamudram
Ameenapuram
Intikanne
Katrapally
Arpanapalle
Upparapalle
Korukondapally
Inugurthy ( Mandal) 
Komatipalle
Kalwala
Dhadnnasari
Penugonda
Beriwada
Rangapuram
Tallapoosapalle
Annaram
Narayanpur
Venkatagiri

Etymology 

Earlier in ancient days when the area was completely covered by forests, the native Lions used to come here to drink water from the nearby lake, later when hunters found the footprints of Lions and then called the place "Kesarimudra" from the local words 'Kesari' which means Lion and 'Mudra' referring to footprints. Later it is gradually evolved to Kesamudram.

Geography

Kesamudram is located 45 km from Warangal. The renovated railway station was inaugurated on 28 April 2018 by MLA Shankar Naik, MP Sitaram Naik, ADR M Subramanyam, Sr Divisional commercial Manager Subith Sharma and railway staff.
All major express trains halt in Kesamudram.

Schools
 Samatha Modern High School, Upparpally Road
 Geethanjali High School
 SVV High School
 Sri Viveka Vardini School, Village Kesamudram
 St Johns High School, Substation Thanda
 Z.P.P.S.S KALVALA

References

Villages in Mahabubabad district